Koritno is a village in the Municipality of Brežice in eastern Slovenia. It lies on the eastern edge of the Gorjanci Hills. The area is part of the traditional region of Lower Carniola. It is now included in the Lower Sava Statistical Region.

References

External links
Koritno on Geopedia

Populated places in the Municipality of Brežice

nl:Kamence (Brežice)
sl:Kamence, Brežice